Von Thronstahl was a German electronic, martial-industrial, neoclassical, and neofolk band which was founded in 1995 by Josef Maria Klumb. It disbanded in 2010.

Discography

Albums and EPs
 1998 Sturmzeit (10" Vinyl)
 2000 Imperium Internum (CD)
 2001 E Pluribus Unum (CD)
 2001 Leipzig "Lichttaufe" 2000 (7" Vinyl)
 2002 Re-Turn Your Revolt Into Style (CD-Box, limited to 500 copies)
 2003 Bellum, Sacrum Bellum!? (CD)
 2004 Pessoa/Cioran (CD, with The Days Of The Trumpet Call, limited to 500 copies)
 2004 Split (with The Days Of The Trumpet Call, limited to 500 (CD) and 300 (Vinyl) copies 2006 Mutter der Schmerzen (MCD) 2007 Sacrificare (CD-Box / CD) 2009 Germanium Metallicum (CD-Box / CD) 2010 Conscriptvm (CD) 2011 Pan-European Christian Freedom Movement (Split LP with Spreu & Weizen, limited edition of 200) 2012 Corona Imperialis (CD) 2012 Vivus Romae. Live in Rome 2007/08/09 (Live CD, limited edition of 500)''

Compilations
Von Thronstahl has contributed tracks to tribute albums for Leni Riefenstahl, Julius Evola, Josef Thorak, Corneliu Zelea Codreanu, Hermann Hendrich, and Arno Breker.

External links

Official
Official Von Thronstahl website

Unofficial

Fansites
English Resource website

Interviews
Heathen Harvest English Language Interview with Von Thronstahl

Reviews
CD review

Misc
Von Thronstahl entry at Discogs

German electronic music groups
German industrial music groups
Musical groups established in 1995
Neofolk music groups
Musical groups disestablished in 2010